Phoxinus septimaniae is a species of minnow that was described in 2007. It is native to France and Spain.

References

septimaniae
Taxa named by Maurice Kottelat
Fish described in 2007